Soul is a 2020 American computer-animated comedy-drama film produced by Pixar Animation Studios for Walt Disney Pictures. It was directed by Pete Docter, co-directed by Kemp Powers, and produced by Dana Murray, from a screenplay by Docter, Powers, and Mike Jones. The film stars the voices of Jamie Foxx, Tina Fey, Graham Norton, Rachel House, Alice Braga, Richard Ayoade, Phylicia Rashad, Donnell Rawlings, Questlove, and Angela Bassett. It follows a pianist, Joe Gardner (Foxx), who is killed in an accident before his big break as a jazz musician and seeks to reunite his separated soul and body.

Docter conceived Soul in January 2016, examining the origins of human personalities and the concept of determinism. He pitched the idea about spacetime involving souls with personalities, during his first meeting with Jones. The film's producers consulted various jazz musicians, including Herbie Hancock and Terri Lyne Carrington, and animated its musical sequences using the sessions of musician Jon Batiste as a reference. Apart from Batiste's original jazz compositions, musicians Trent Reznor and Atticus Ross composed the film's score. Production on Soul lasted for four years on an approximate $150million budget. This was the first Pixar film to feature a black lead.

Soul premiered at the London Film Festival on October 11, 2020, and was scheduled to be theatrically released on June 19 and November 20. However, the feature was postponed due to the COVID-19 pandemic. Soul was released direct-to-streaming on Disney+ on December 25, 2020 (alongside the SparkShort known as Burrow), and in theaters in countries without the streaming service. Soul was well-received by critics for its craftsmanship, story, characters, and musical score. Organizations like the National Board of Review and the American Film Institute named the film as one of the top ten films of 2020. Soul was nominated for three awards at the 93rd Academy Awards, winning two, and received numerous other accolades.

Plot

In New York City, pianist Joe Gardner teaches music part-time at a middle school while dreaming of playing jazz professionally. When he receives an offer for a full-time teaching position, his mother Libba urges him to accept it. Joe learns famous jazz musician Dorothea Williams has an opening in her quartet and auditions at a jazz club. Impressed with Joe's piano playing, Dorothea hires him for that night's show. As Joe heads off, his excitement distracts him, and he falls into a manhole down the sewer drain.

Joe finds himself as a disembodied soul heading into an afterlife dubbed the "Great Beyond". Unwilling to die, he tries to escape but ends up in the "Great Before" — a realm where souls gain personalities and interests before being born on Earth. In the Great Before, counselors — all named Jerry — prepare unborn souls for life with the help of mentor souls. Each soul has a badge that grants passage to Earth, once the badge is completely filled with personality traits. Mistaken for a mentor, Joe is assigned to train a soul named 22, who wants to avoid Earth. 22 discovers that Joe's physical body is hospitalized and in a coma. She agrees to let Joe help find her "spark" — a soul's personal passion — to complete her badge so he can use it to return home. After Joe fails to find 22 a spark, they visit "the zone", a place that souls enter when their passions create a euphoric trance, but becomes a trap for obsessed, lost souls. They meet Moonwind—a galleon captain—who helps the duo locate Joe's body on Earth.

Joe returns to Earth but accidentally carries 22 with him. They mistakenly enter the wrong bodies — with 22 inhabiting Joe's body and Joe inhabiting the body of a therapy cat. They find Moonwind, who agrees to meet at the jazz club to restore Joe to his body. In the meantime, 22 settles into Joe's body and enjoys small moments while interacting with Joe's peers. She holds poignant conversations with his student Connie, his barber Dez, and mother. Meanwhile, Terry, being in charge of counting souls, arrives on earth to find Joe and restore the count.

As the day ends, Joe and 22 visit Moonwind to return Joe to his body. After Joe tells 22 that her experiences were not purposes, 22 refuses and flees to find her spark with Joe tailing behind. As they run through a subway station, Terry traps them both and brings them back to the Great Before. 22 realizes her badge is filled out, yet Joe insists it was because of his traits, and that she has not truly found her spark. Angry, 22 throws the badge at him and disappears into the zone. A Jerry informs Joe that a spark is not a soul's purpose in life, but Joe refuses to believe this and uses 22's badge to return to Earth.

The show at the jazz club is successful, but Joe is upset at his unchanged life even after fulfilling his dream. Looking at objects that 22 collected while in his body, he recalls the moments they had enjoyed together. Joe realizes these experiences have given 22 her spark. By playing piano, he enters the zone with the intent to return her badge, but discovers that she has become a lost soul. He chases her down, showing her a maple seed she collected to remind her of her time on Earth. They realize that a spark is not a soul's purpose, but indicates an intention to live. Joe's actions restore 22 to normal, returning her badge and escorting her out of the Great Before for her journey to Earth.

As Joe prepares to enter the Great Beyond, a Jerry stops him and offers another chance at life for finally inspiring 22 to live. Joe returns to his body on Earth, and starts the next day committed to enjoying life.

Voice cast

 Jamie Foxx as Joe Gardner, a jazz pianist and music teacher
 Tina Fey as 22, a cynical soul with a dim view of life on Earth
 Graham Norton as Moonwind, a spiritual sign twirler
 Rachel House as Terry, an obsessive soul counter
 Alice Braga, Richard Ayoade, Wes Studi, Fortune Feimster, and Zenobia Shroff as the five soul counselors in the Great Before who are all named Jerry
 Phylicia Rashad as Libba Gardner, Joe's mother, who works as a seamstress 
 Donnell Rawlings as Dez, Joe's barber
 Questlove as Lamont "Curley" Baker, a drummer in Dorothea Williams' band and a former student of Joe's
 Angela Bassett as Dorothea Williams, a jazz saxophonist

Additionally, Daveed Diggs plays Paul, Joe's neighborhood frenemy; Cora Champommier plays Connie, one of Joe's middle school band students; Margo Hall and Rhodessa Jones play Melba and Lulu, Libba's co-workers; June Squibb plays Gerel, a soul who meets Joe before going to the Great Beyond; and Esther Chae is credited with playing Miho, a bassist in Williams' band, but Miho has no lines in the final film. Cody Chesnutt provides his vocals, from his song "Parting Ways", as a street singer with a guitar.

Sakina Jaffrey, Calum Grant, Laura Mooney, Peggy Flood, Ochuwa Oghie, Jeannie Tirado, and Cathy Cavadini provide the voices of Doctor, Hedge Fund Manager, Therapy Cat Lady, Marge, Dancerstar, Principal Arroyo, and Dreamerwind.

Production

Development and writing

Soul began development in January 2016, when director Pete Docter sought new creative directions during the announcement of the 88th Academy Awards. He pondered the origins of human personalities with the concept of determinism. In his first meeting with co-writer Mike Jones, Docter pitched an idea set in spacetime involving souls with personalities. The film spent four years in production, with an approximate $150 million budget.

Docter and Jones worked on the development of the main character for about two years. Initial ideas included portraying Joe as a scientist, which did not feel "so naturally pure". Pixar eventually settled on portraying the film's main character as a musician because they wanted an appealing profession for the audience. According to Docter, once the creative team decided the main character played jazz music, the filmmakers chose to make him African-American due to the race being tied to jazz history.

With co-writer Kemp Powers's help, Docter wrote Joe during the film's early development. Powers's initial contract was 12-weeks long, but was later extended. After making extensive contributions to the film, Powers became a co-director, making him Pixar's first African-American co-director. Powers based several elements of Joe on his personal life, but wanted the character to "transcend [his] own experience" in order to make him more accessible. Powers also placed additional emphasis on authentically depicting Joe's relationships within the black community. In order to portray accurately African-American culture within the film, Pixar worked closely with an internal "Cultural Trust" composed of black Pixar employees, and hired several consultants. These consultants included musicians Herbie Hancock, Terri Lyne Carrington, Quincy Jones, and Jon Batiste; educator Johnnetta Cole; and stars Questlove and Diggs.

The idea of Joe's soul entering the body of a therapy cat came from Jones. Docter and Powers appreciated the idea, as it allowed Joe to "be able to look at his own life from a different perspective" and appreciate it. According to Murray, the filmmakers were undecided on Soul ending before the last screening. Some test versions of the film ended featuring Joe pondering whether to pass on to the Great Beyond; returning to Earth a year later; or staying in the Great Before as a mentor. Initial storyboards featured several brief scenes showing 22's life on Earth after her new birth, including one of her reuniting with Joe in New York. These scenes were ultimately discarded.

Casting
In August 2019, Jamie Foxx, Tina Fey, Questlove, Phylicia Rashad and Daveed Diggs were announced as starring in the film. In March 2020, Angela Bassett announced she was cast in the film. During the release of the film's trailer in October 2020, Richard Ayoade, Graham Norton, Rachel House, Alice Braga, Wes Studi, Fortune Feimster, Zenobia Shroff, Donnell Rawlings and June Squibb were also announced to be in the cast.

Docter said Jamie Foxx was perfect for Joe, citing his comedic skills and musical background. Foxx related the film's "bittersweet [feeling] of losing someone but gaining a vision of joy", following the death of his 36-year-old sister in October 2020.

Tina Fey, in addition to voicing 22, also contributed to the screenplay, helping to write her character's lines. She considered the film, in the context of the COVID-19 pandemic, a "helpful reminder that [life] isn't defined by achievement or attainment".

Animation and design
Soul is Pixar's first film to feature an African-American protagonist. Pixar and Docter were mindful of the history of racist imagery (particularly caricatured depictions of African-Americans) in animation and wanted to create black characters as well as integrate authentic African-American culture into the film's "DNA" to prevent caricatures, stereotypes, and tropes. Pixar sought to capture the fine details of the characters, including the textures of black hair and the way light plays on various tones of black skin. According to Powers, the animators used lighting in emphasizing the character's ethnic features.  Cinematographer Bradford Young worked as a lighting consultant on the film.

Animators used footage of several music performers, including Batiste, as reference for the film's musical sequences. By capturing MIDI data from the sessions, animators retraced the exact key being played on the piano with each note and animated the performances authentically. According to Docter, the animators assigned to specific musical instruments often either had experience playing them or a great appreciation for them.

The souls were animated by the filmmakers in a "vaporous", "ethereal", and "non-physical" way. Souls were designed to depict various religious and cultural outlooks. The designs were also inspired by early drawings made by Docter. Animators created two designs for the souls in the film: one for the new souls in "The Great Before" (described as "very cute, very appealing, with simple, rounded shapes" by supervising animator Jude Brownbill) and one for mentor souls (feature distinctive characteristics since they have been on Earth). They differentiated souls from ghosts by adjusting their color palette accordingly. Animating the souls' designs was challenging and substantial. According to Murray, several artists helped create the souls' designs by giving their suggestions and opinions on how they should look.

The design of soul counselors ("Jerrys") originated from line drawings made by story artist Aphton Corbin. Another artist created wire sculptures of them, and the design was finalized. Together, with the design of "Terry", they were seen by critics as a reference to Osvaldo Cavandoli's 1971 Italian animated series La Linea.

Soul fantastical elements were difficult to render. To address the issue, Docter referred to his film Inside Out (2015), where the filmmakers personified through physicality. For the Great Before, the filmmakers did not want it to be based in any specific culture given its nature of universality. They sought inspiration from the architecture of 1930s–1960s world's fairs, making a "sense of awe and importance". Production designer Steve Pilcher believed in the simplicity of the Great Before, saying that it was complicated and naive. According to Docter, the aim of the design was to "make a grand statement about learning and knowledge." The personality pavilions were designed to be "abstract-looking shapes" as a literal interpretation of the abstract ideas they represent. For the Great Beyond, the filmmakers conceptualized "going toward the light", which they believed the audience would understand.

The astral plane sequence took months to create, despite the actual scene having a short duration. Visual effects supervisor Bill Watral compared the sequence to Psycho (1960) shower scene, taking a long time to film in spite of the actual short time span. During this sequence, filmmakers painstakingly animated sands, liquids, and rocks for the brief sequence.

To animate New York, the filmmakers explored jazz clubs and pizza stops for inspiration. A barbershop scene received additional input from Powers. The animation style moved away from photorealism, depicting the city as distorted and crooked.

Music

Musicians Trent Reznor and Atticus Ross of Nine Inch Nails composed an ambient score for the metaphysical segments of the film, while Batiste composed a number of original jazz songs for the New York City-based segments of the film. Batiste created a "user-friendly jazz", which felt "authentic" but could still be appreciated by a general audience. Ross composed a "somewhat ominous" musical cue in the afterlife walkway scene, which also incorporated real-world sounds. Reznor and Ross were brought in on the recommendation of sound designer Ren Klyce, who had worked extensively with the duo in David Fincher films.

The score and the original songs from Soul were released in two vinyl-exclusive albums, while also compiled onto a single digital album. "It's All Right", the end credits song performed by Batiste, was originally recorded by The Impressions. A second cover of the song, a duet between Batiste and British soul singer Celeste, was released alongside the film.

Release

Theatrical and streaming
The 101-minute Soul premiered on October 11, 2020, at the BFI London Film Festival. It was originally scheduled for theatrical release in the United States on June 19, but due to the COVID-19 pandemic, Soul was pushed back to November 20. The film eventually shifted to a December 25 Disney+ release. Unlike Mulan, Soul did not do so through Disney+ Premier Access, making it free for all subscribers.

In international markets where Disney+ was not available, Soul was released theatrically. These included China, the Philippines, Malaysia, Taiwan, Thailand, Singapore, among others. The film was included in their lineups of the 2020 Cannes Film Festival and the Rome Film Festival; it opened on October 15. In theaters, Soul was intended to be accompanied by SparkShorts short film Burrow, but it premiered on Disney+ instead. A prequel short to Soul was released in 2021, titled 22 vs. Earth. It focuses on 22 leading a rebellion against her superiors.

Home media
Walt Disney Studios Home Entertainment released Soul on Ultra HD Blu-ray, Blu-ray, DVD, and digital download on March 23, 2021. Physical copies contain behind-the-scenes featurettes, audio commentary, and deleted scenes.

Reception

Box office 
Soul earned $121million in other territories. The film grossed $7.65 million in its opening weekend in 10 markets, including $5.5 million from China. By February 2021, Soul had become the highest-grossing Pixar release ever in Russia ($18.3 million), Ukraine ($1.9 million), and Saudi Arabia ($5.9 million). Its top international markets at that point were China ($57.9 million), Russia, South Korea ($14.8 million), Taiwan ($6.4 million), and Saudi Arabia.

Streaming viewership 
Following the release of Soul on Disney+, research firm Screen Engine reported that 13 percent of viewers watched the film, and it over-indexed among parents, particularly mothers. The company also said that Soul was among the most-watched straight-to-streaming titles of the year, behind Hamilton and Wonder Woman 1984. On December 21–27, 2020, the film gathered 1.669 billion minutes of watch time, making it the number 1 streaming title that week. Nielsen reported that Wonder Woman 1984, with 2.252 billion minutes of streaming on HBO Max, had surpassed Soul, with 1.7 billion minutes on Disney+, in streaming numbers on Christmas weekend. Samba TV later reported that 2.4 million households streamed the film over its opening weekend. Nielsen reported that Soul was the most streamed film across all platforms, during the week from January 4–10, 2021.

Critical response 

The site's critical consensus reads, "A film as beautiful to contemplate as it is to behold, Soul proves Pixar's power to deliver outstanding all-ages entertainment remains undimmed." Metacritic, which uses a weighted average, assigned Soul a score of 83 out of 100 based on 55 critics, indicating "universal acclaim".

Several journalists praised Soul for its craftsmanship, which they saw as an exercise of Docter's expertise, as the film was considered a return of Pixar's form by some critics. Leslie Felperin (The Hollywood Reporter) and Jason Solomons (TheWrap) described the film as its peak, with Solomons characterized its "colorful visuals and gentle wisdom". A. O. Scott of The New York Times expressed its "combination of skill, feeling and inspiration".

The story, characters, and music were sources of praise. Kaleem Aftab of IndieWire felt the narrative "[veered] off in many unexpected directions, so that even the inevitable end point feels just right." USA Today Brian Truitt commended the performances of Foxx and Fey. For Time Out Dubai, Whelan Barzey believed Joe's story could appeal to many generations. Felperin and Peter Travers (ABC News) praised the musical score, calling it "sublime". Truitt and Travers credited Batiste, Reznor, and Ross for their music merits.

Reviews were not uniformly positive. Kirsten Acuna from Insider felt that "the studio had taken a few steps backward" in their racial "sensitivity" as Soul used the same trope of "turning Black characters into creatures". Molly Freeman of Screen Rant acknowledged the film's "message about the meaning of life and finding purpose, but it's messy and only made muddier by the questions the movie sets up then fails to answer. The result is Soul loses much of its emotional impact, with the third act playing out more like a rush to the finish line of the story without giving as much weight to the themes and emotional throughline of the film." Charles Pulliam-Moore of Gizmodo wrote that "Soul comes across less like an earnest and casual celebration of everyday Blackness, and more like a twee depiction of it that’s meant for white audiences' consumption."

Accolades 

At the 93rd Academy Awards, Soul received a nomination for Best Sound, and won Best Animated Feature and Best Original Score. The film's other nominations include ten Annie Awards (winning seven), three British Academy Film Awards (winning two), a Critics' Choice Movie Award (which it won), and two Golden Globe Awards (winning both). It was named one of the ten best films of 2020 by the National Board of Review (where it also won Best Animated Film) and the American Film Institute.

Notes

References

External links
 
 
 
 Script 

2020 comedy-drama films
2020 computer-animated films
2020 fantasy films
2020s American animated films
2020s musical films
2020s English-language films
African-American animated films
African-American musical films
African-American musical drama films
American children's animated fantasy films
American computer-animated films
American fantasy films
American musical drama films
American musical fantasy films
American ghost films
American animated feature films
American animated musical films
Animated musical films
Animated films about cats
Animated films about music and musicians
Animated films set in New York City
Annie Award winners
Best Animated Feature Academy Award winners
Best Animated Feature Annie Award winners
Best Animated Feature BAFTA winners
Best Animated Feature Film Golden Globe winners
Body swapping in films
Disney+ original films
Magic realism films
Metaphysical fiction films
Existentialist films
Films about the afterlife
Films about educators
Films about pianos and pianists
Films directed by Pete Docter
Films impacted by the COVID-19 pandemic
Films scored by Atticus Ross
Films scored by Trent Reznor
Films set in hospitals
Films that won the Best Original Score Academy Award
Films with screenplays by Kemp Powers
Films with screenplays by Pete Docter
Jazz films
Pixar animated films
Walt Disney Pictures animated films